Eogystia hippophaecolus is a moth in the family Cossidae. It is found in China (Shaanxi).

References

Natural History Museum Lepidoptera generic names catalog

Moths described in 1990
Cossinae
Moths of Asia